Amursk is a town in Khabarovsk Krai, Russia, located on the left bank of the Amur River  south of Komsomolsk-on-Amur. Population:

History
It was founded as an urban-type settlement on June 19, 1958, in connection with the construction of a pulp mill near the Nanai settlement Padali. Town status was granted to it in 1973.

Administrative and municipal status
Within the framework of administrative divisions, Amursk serves as the administrative center of Amursky District, even though it is not a part of it. As an administrative division, it is incorporated separately as the town of krai significance of Amursk—an administrative unit with the status equal to that of the districts. As a municipal division, Amursk is incorporated within Amursky Municipal District as Amursk Urban Settlement.

Demographics
The population grew from 3,500 in 1959 to a high point of 58,395 inhabitants in 1989. Since the dissolution of the Soviet Union, the population trend reversed.

Economy
In addition to the cellulose and paper mill, there is chemical production and timber production conducted in and near the town, as well as some machinery production.

Transportation
There is a goods railway to the town, connecting to the Khabarovsk-Komsomolsk-Dzemgi line at the station of Mylki. There is also a road connection to Komsomolsk-on-Amur.

References

Notes

Sources

External links
Official website of Amursk
Directory of organizations in Amursk 

Cities and towns in Khabarovsk Krai
Cities and towns built in the Soviet Union
Populated places established in 1958
1958 establishments in the Soviet Union